The Fuqing dialect (福清話, BUC: Hók-chiăng-uâ,), or Hokchia, is an Eastern Min dialect. It is spoken in the county-level city of Fuqing, China, situated within the prefecture-level city of Fuzhou. It is not completely mutually intelligible with the Fuzhou dialect.

Phonology 
The Fuqing dialect has fifteen initials, forty-six rimes, and seven tones.

Initials 

(The Chinese characters represent the sample characters taken from the Qī Lín Bāyīn (《戚林八音》, Foochow Romanized: Chék Lìng Báik-ĭng), while the Latin letters are from the orthography Foochow Romanized).

Rimes 
Including the syllabic nasal consonant , the Fuqing dialect has forty-six rimes in total.

The rime before the slash is the close or tense rime (緊韻、窄韻), while after the slash is the open or lax rime (鬆韻、寬韻). The Chinese characters represent the sample characters taken from the Qī Lín Bāyīn (《戚林八音》, Foochow Romanized: Chék Lìng Báik-ĭng, with further characters from rimes with glottal codas. The Latin letters are from the orthography Foochow Romanized.

The rime  only has one syllable , and is not found in the Qī Lín Bāyīn; furthermore, Foochow Romanized does not have a way to represent this syllable.

In the modern Rongcheng dialect, the rime  has now merged into  and is no longer distinguished. Also in the new Rongcheng dialect, the rime  has merged into .

Tones
The Fuqing dialect has seven tones, with the Middle Chinese four tone categories of level/even (平), departing (去) and entering (入) all divided into dark (陰) and light (陽) categories. The names and the sequence of the seven tones are outlined below, as listed in the traditional rime dictionary Qī Lín Bāyīn:

The dark level (陰平 Ĭng-bìng) tone falls the most sharply; although the light departing (陽去 Iòng-ké̤ṳ) tone is also a high falling tone, its fall in pitch is not as dramatic.

Additionally, the Fuqing dialect contains the neutral tone in colloquial speech, which in tone sandhi produces a new tone contour, one that rises (35).

Close-open rimes
The phenomenon of close and open rime alternation (also known as tense and lax rimes; in Chinese "寬窄韻現象", "鬆、緊韻現象" or "本韻、變韻現象") is one found throughout the dialects of cities and villages in the traditional Fuzhou area (the ten towns of Fuzhou, 福州十邑). But it is not found in, for example, the dialects of Gutian (古田) and Luoyuan (羅源). The dialect of Fuqing, along with that of the urban area of Fuzhou, exhibits this phenomenon.

According to the original listing of the rimes in the Qī Lín Bāyīn, the medial vowel did not change with the tones. But in the Fuqing dialect, when the rime is in either one of the departing tones or in the dark entering tone, the medial vowel changes to another, the rime being called the open rime. When in either of the two level tones, in the rising tone, or in the light entering tone, the rime this time does not change; this rime is called the close rime. In the Fuqing dialect, with the exception of [ŋ] and [iau], all rimes exhibit this close-open alternation.

In the Gutian dialect, the same vowel is preserved in the rime , regardless of tone. Similarly,  in the upper departing (上入) tone becomes the open rime , where the vowel has again changed.

Within the Fuqing dialect, the open rime's vowel is always more open (alias 'lower') by a degree than the close rime. For example, 知 is read  as a close rime, with the close vowel . All close rimes becomes their corresponding open rimes according to this rule.

Sound changes 
The Fuqing dialect has a particularly rich set of phonetic changes. The pronunciation of a particular Chinese character under certain circumstances can undergo changes in its initial, its rime, and its tone. For example, the word 兄弟哥 (brother, Standard Mandarin: 兄弟) is made of the three words 兄 , 弟  and 哥 , but is actually pronounced as 兄弟哥 . Within this word, the first syllable 兄 has undergone tone sandhi and has thus changed tone; the last syllable 哥 has lost its initial consonant; and the rime of the middle syllable 弟 has changed in both vowel and tone. Within lexical or semantic items, the three features of initial, rime and tone are subject to sandhi phenomena. In colloquial Fuqing speech, this type of change is very frequently encountered, but is rare in Chinese as a whole.

Initial assimilation
In colloquial Fuqing speech, the initial consonants of Chinese characters or syllables are subject to change under specific circumstances within lexical items. The first modern work to examine the phonology of the Fuzhou dialect, the Mǐnyīn Yánjiū (閩音研究) used the term "initial assimilation" (in ) to refer to this phenomenon.

Initial assimilation in the Fuqing dialect occurs in polysyllabic lexemes (i.e. lexical items or words of two or more syllables or Chinese characters) and certain semantic groups. Usually within these groups, all syllables apart from the first undergo initial assimilation. Not every phrase will undergo initial assimilation, and the ones that do may differ from their counterparts in the other Min Dong varieties.

The syllable that undergoes initial assimilation is the "latter character"; that which precedes it is the "former character". Initial assimilation in the Fuqing dialect consists of three types: voicing, nasalisation/nasal assimilation and suppression. The rime of the former character determines the type of assimilation of the latter character's initial.

Which voiced consonant or nasal consonant or whether the consonant is suppressed depends on the place of articulation of the latter syllable's initial.

Type A dentals after voicing assimilation do not become the standard , but are slightly flapped.

Tone sandhi
As with the majority of southern varieties of Chinese, the Fuqing dialect exhibits tone sandhi. The phenomenon of tone sandhi in the Fuqing dialect contains a whole set of rules to be followed, but it is still rather complex: one tone can undergo different changes depending on what tone follows it. For example, the light entering (陽入) tone in front of the dark departing (陰去) tone becomes  (11), but in front of a rising tone (上聲) it becomes  (55); and in front of the dark entering (陰入) tone it becomes  (21).

In many local dialects of the Fuzhou area (within the Eastern Min family), the last syllable of a word does not undergo tone sandhi. However, in the Fuqing dialect, the last syllable's tone does change under certain circumstances.

Below is a full table for the tone sandhi on two syllable domains for the main "new" Rongcheng pronunciation of the Fuqing dialect:

Aside from words composed of two syllables (or binomes), those composed of three syllables also undergo tone sandhi.

Rime changes
Within polysyllabic words (of two or more syllables) or characters within one sense unit, if in the departing tone (both light departing and dark departing) or in the dark entering tone, and if it is not the last character in the unit, the rime undergoes a transformation. This rime change is related to the open/close rime phenomenon: as these three tones only have open rimes, when the character changes tone through tone sandhi, the open rimes will become the corresponding close rimes.

Hence 「清」being light level tone has a close rime, so although it is in a non-final position within the group, its rime does not change. On the other hand, 「福」 is light entering tone, while 「縣」 is dark departing tone; both characters hence have open rimes. As 「福」 is in a non-final position in its group, its rime changes;「縣」 is the last character and so resists the change.

Internal variation 

The Fuqing dialect is divided into several branches, based on their phonology:

 The Rongcheng branch includes an area covering the city center, as well as the towns of Dongzhang (東張鎮), Jingyang (鏡洋鎮), Yuxi (漁溪鎮), Shangjing (上逕鎮), Haikou (海口鎮), Chengtou (城頭鎮), Nanling (南嶺鎮), Longtian (龍田鎮), Jiangjing (江鏡鎮) and parts of Xincuo (新厝鎮). The features of this branch include the following:
 merger of the  秋 and  燒 finals;
 the original area of Rongcheng Town (融城鎮) had a split between old and new, where several finals have merged; 
 the tone sandhi system of the new Rongcheng dialect has converged with that of surrounding areas.
 The Gaoshan branch covers the towns of Gangtou (港頭鎮), Sanshan (三山鎮), Shapu (沙埔鎮), Gaoshan (高山鎮) and Donghan (東瀚鎮). It is characterized by:
 relatively non-noticeable rime tensing;
 a clear distinction of the  秋 and  燒 finals.
 The Jiangyin branch just includes Jinyin Town. It is characterized by:
 some words with voiced initials in entering tones retain the final glottal stop whereas the other branches have lost that glottal stop.
 there is a reported phonemic difference in vowel length in certain words with glottal stops, e.g.  medicine has a long vowel, whereas  examine, read has a short vowel, although both are read .
 The Yidu branch, comprising Yidu Town. It is geographically close to Yongtai County, and features which are closer to the Fuzhou dialect. Some of these are:
 final glottal stops are retained from Middle Chinese final obstruent stops, as in the Fuzhou dialect;
 it has the triphthong  where Rongcheng would have a diphthong ;
 there are more diphthongs where Rongcheng would have monophthongs, e.g. Yidu  for Rongcheng .

There is a high degree of mutual intelligibility between the three branches despite their differences, and the original Rongcheng dialect, spoken in an area now part of Yuping Road, is well understood across the whole Fuqing region.

Historical evolution 
The Fuqing dialect has lost the voiced obstruents from Middle Chinese, has merged the final nasal consonants into one phoneme and similarly for the entering tone final stop consonant. But it has also preserved many readings from Middle Chinese: its pattern of entering tone readings greatly matches that of Middle Chinese, apart from the colloquial layer of character readings which has lost them.

Overview
Old and Middle Chinese had a large array of voiced consonants, which are preserved in the Wu group of Chinese varieties, e.g. in the Suzhou dialect. But the Fuqing dialect has devoiced the obstruents, turning them into voiceless consonants, just as other Eastern Min varieties of Chinese have.

The 疑 initial of Middle Chinese, reconstructed as the velar nasal , has not been preserved by many modern varieties of Chinese. In standard Mandarin, the initial  has been completely lost, with some having merged into the initial  (e.g. 牛, 虐, 擬). In Wu, Yue and Hakka, the  initial with front vowels  and  have either been lost (hence merging into the 影 initial) or become another initial. In some Mandarin varieties as well as Yue, a  sound is added to the beginning of back vowels of the null initial class 影 (e.g. pronouncing 安 as ), but in the Fuqing dialect the 影 initial always remains null.

This lack of labiodental consonants is common to all of the Min varieties as well as Sino-Korean.

This feature is also common to most of Min, implying that it has conserved this feature from Old Chinese.

The three nasal codas of Middle Chinese have become one velar nasal  in the Fuqing dialect. The three entering tone voiceless stop codas also all became a velar stop , which has weakened to a glottal stop .

The Fuqing dialect possesses just one tone derived from the historical rising tone (上聲) of Middle Chinese, corresponding to the dark rising tone where those with historical voiceless initials have remained. Those with historical voiced obstruents in the former light rising tone have merged with the light departing tone. Those with historical sonorants underwent a split: in colloquial readings they grouped with light departing tone, whereas in literary readings these joined the dark rising tone. 

There is also an innovation in entering tone characters. Where in the rime book Qī Lín Bāyīn (《戚林八音》), an entering tone character begins with an unvoiced consonant (e.g. the initials 花, 嘉, 歌, 之, 過, 橋, 奇), in the colloquial reading these lose their final glottal stop. Thus dark entering merges into dark departing, and light entering merges into the dark level tone. In the Fuzhou dialect these preserve their identity as entering tone in the colloquial reading. Nevertheless, in literary reading, these characters retain their glottal stop as a marker of the entering tone in Fuqing as well as in Fuzhou.

Literary and colloquial readings
The Fuqing dialect has a rich source of variation in its split between literary and colloquial readings, with initials, rimes and tones being affected. They can be divided into seven types:
 Difference in initials: 富 ( / )
 Difference in rimes: 清 ( / )
 Difference in tones: 利 ( / )
 Difference in initial and rime: 夫 ( / )
 Difference in initial and tone: 遠 ( / )
 Difference in rime and tone: 兩 ( / )
 Difference in initial, rime and tone: 網 ( / )

Usually when there is a difference between literary and colloquial readings, the literary reading is used in reading and more literary compound words, whilst the colloquial one is used in vernacular speech, common surnames and local place names. For example, the common verb 聽 listen has the colloquial reading , the surname 劉 (Liu in Mandarin) is pronounced , and the place-name component 清 in the names of Minqing 閩清 and Fuqing 福清 are pronounced , though the name of Qingliu County 清流縣, being outside the Fuzhou area, uses the literary pronunciation. Literary pronunciations are also used in poetry, with some readings specifically used only in this context; additionally, neologisms generally use literary pronunciation.

Vocabulary
Fuqing has had a long history of migration, with which has come a large number of different sources of vocabulary, creating several layers or lexical strata. One of the layers that the Fuqing dialect has is the Minyue language, which today remains as a source of colloquial vocabulary. Despite their common use, these vocabulary items often cannot be traced back to a Chinese root character.

Vocabulary derived from Old Chinese can be classified into two types. The first comes from migrants from the Three Kingdoms period, when people of the Eastern Wu migrated to Fujian, bringing the varieties of Wu and Chu. This layer is already extinct in the Chinese varieties spoken in the homelands of the Wu and Chu regions, but it is still found across the Min varieties of Fujian. The second type derives from the Northern and Southern Dynasties. Such vocabulary is often used in colloquial speech.

The lexical stratum from Middle Chinese derives from the Chinese spoken in the Tang dynasty, with some later additions from the Song dynasty, forming the principal literary layer.

Modern Standard Mandarin Chinese has also been source of vocabulary, via neologisms or formal compounds.

In more modern times, the rise of new technologies, products and concepts has produced more direct loans from standard Mandarin, which may be used despite those sounds being rare in Fuqing dialect or even if there are Fuqing roots that could have been used.

References

Related Links
漢字古今音資料庫 A Fuqing dialect character dictionary is available, by selecting 現代 > 閩語 >閩東區 > 福清
Fuqing dialect programming 《講世事》

Eastern Min
Culture in Fujian
Languages of Taiwan
Languages of China
Fuqing